This page summarises the results and performance of Kazakhstani football clubs in international competitions. Clubs began participating in the competitions of the Asian Football Confederation from the 1994–95 season until the 2000–01 season. No clubs participated in continental competitions during the 2001–02 season, as the Football Federation of Kazakhstan finalised their switch to become the 52nd member of UEFA. Kazakhstani clubs have played in UEFA competitions since the 2002–03 season. FC Astana-64 (by that time Astana), in the 2007–08 UEFA Champions League, were the first club to advance in a European tournament.  Tobol reached the second qualifying round of the UEFA Cup by winning three rounds of the Intertoto Cup in 2007. Shakhter Karagandy were the first team to reach group stage of any competition in 2013, qualifying to UEFA Europa League after being defeated in UEFA Champions League play-off round. Astana became the first ever Kazakhstani team to reach UEFA Champions League group stage in 2015, passing three rounds of qualification and play-offs. Astana also became the first ever Kazakhstani team to qualify for knockout stage of any European competition in 2017, by finishing runner-up in 2017–18 UEFA Europa League group stage (reached the Round of 32). In 2021 Kairat became the first ever Kazakhstani club to compete in the group stage of inaugural UEFA Europa Conference League.

Asian competitions

Asian Club Championship
 1994–95: Ansat Pavlodar
 1995: Yelimay Semipalatinsk
 1996–97: Yelimay Semipalatinsk
 1997–98: Taraz Zhambyl
 1998–99: FC Irtysh
 1999–2000: FC Irtysh
 2000–01: FC Irtysh

Asian Cup Winners' Cup
 1994–95: Taraz Club Dzhambul
 1995: Vostok Ust-Kamenogorsk
 1996–97: Ordabasy-SKIF Chimkent
 1997–98: Kairat Almaty
 1998–99: Kaisar Kzyl-Orda
 1999–2000: Kaisar Hurricane
 2000–01: SOPFK Kairat Almaty

UEFA competitions

Summary

Due to Kazakhstan's spring-autumn league season, Kazakh clubs are able to start their European campaign only for the next season. Current club allocation is as following: 1 club (champion) for the Champions League 1st qualifying round, 3 clubs for the Europa Conference League 2nd qualifying round.

Key to colours

Notes
 – Historical names shown in brackets according to respective seasons
(1) Tobol did not apply for Intertoto Cup 2002
(2) No club went through appropriated licensing procedures to play on a European stage for 2004–05 season
(3) Only Kairat went through appropriate licensing procedures to play on a European stage for 2005–06 season
(4) Club failed to comply with licensing
(5) Intertoto Cup has been discontinued after season 2008.
(6) Almaty and Megasport officials announced that the two clubs have merged to a new team called Lokomotiv, who inherited Almaty UEFA Europa League 2009–10 spot earned through Kazakhstan Cup 2008. However, Lokomotiv were eventually denied the UEFA License for competing in Europa League due to legal difficulties when creating the new club. Thereby, the potential candidates for one spot left in Europa League were Kaisar, Zhetysu, Shakhter and Okzhetpes. Kaisar and Shakhter were, however, denied a license and Zhetysu eventually withdrew from Europe due to financial difficulties. That left Okzhetpes, 9th positioned club in season, as the third Europa League participant.
(7) 2020 Kazakhstan Cup was cancelled due to COVID-19 pandemic in Kazakhstan. This situation allowed Shakhter, 4th positioned club in season, to take part in the Europa Conference League as a third participant from Kazakhstan.

Progress by season

UEFA Champions League

UEFA Cup / Europa League

UEFA Europa Conference League

UEFA Intertoto Cup

Notes
 (1) Tobol advanced to 2nd Qualifying round of UEFA Cup

All-time goalscorers

Players scored at least five goals representing Kazakhstan clubs. Players in bold are still active in sports.

All-time record

Overall table

Notes
 (1) Including matches in UEFA Intertoto Cup, where points for wins and draws were not counted for UEFA coefficients table.

UEFA Points by season

All-time record vs. specific country

References

Football in Kazakhstan
European football clubs in international competitions